Anne Canovas (born 25 October 1957) is a French actress. She appeared in more than sixty films since 1978.

Selected filmography

References

External links 

1957 births
Living people
French film actresses
People from Algiers